The Courts Reform (Scotland) Act 2014 is an Act of the Scottish Parliament passed in October 2014 to improve access to the civil justice system and while making the Court of Session a place for the more complex cases.

History
The Bill was introduced by Kenny MacAskill MSP on 6 February 2014. The Bill was passed by the Parliament on 7 October 2014. It received Royal Assent on 6 May 2015.

Provisions
The legislation created a national Sheriff Appeal Court.

The legislation raised the threshold from £5,000 to £100,000 for a case to be brought to the Court of Session. Some changes, such as a reduced ability to recover counsel's fees, make arbitration a more attractive means of dispute resolution.

References

External links
 Progress of the bill at Scottish Parliament

Acts of the Scottish Parliament 2014
Courts of Scotland